The Main Line Subdivision is a railroad line owned by CSX Transportation in the U.S. states of Kentucky and Tennessee. At its north end the line continues south from the Louisville Terminal Subdivision and at its south end the line continues south as the Nashville Terminal Subdivision.

The Main Line Subdivision was originally built as the namesake line of the Louisville and Nashville Railroad. Through various mergers, it passed through the Family Lines System, Seaboard System, and finally to CSX.

See also
 List of CSX Transportation lines

References

CSX Transportation lines
Transportation in Jefferson County, Kentucky